Alūksnes Ziņas is a regional newspaper published in Latvia.

Alūksne
Newspapers published in Latvia